Hudson Falls Historic District is a national historic district located at Hudson Falls in Washington County, New York.  It includes 148 contributing buildings, one contributing site, and two contributing objects.  It encompasses the historic center of the village including residential, commercial, civic, and ecclesiastical buildings, centered on the village park.  The buildings were built between 1812 and 1935, the majority between 1875 and 1900, and reflect a variety of 19th and early-20th-century architectural styles.  Located within the district is the former Washington County Courthouse (1873) and the separately listed US Post Office-Hudson Falls.  One of the oldest structures is a law office building constructed about 1810 and located at 177 Main Street.  It is notable as having been the office for Henry C. Martindale (1780-1860) and his clerk, New York Governor Silas Wright (1795-1847).

It was listed on the National Register of Historic Places in 1983.

Gallery

References

Historic districts on the National Register of Historic Places in New York (state)
Houses on the National Register of Historic Places in New York (state)
Historic districts in Washington County, New York
Houses in Washington County, New York
National Register of Historic Places in Washington County, New York